Kirk Jones (born November 3, 1973), better known by his stage name Sticky Fingaz, is an American hardcore rapper, record producer, and actor best known as a member of multi-platinum hardcore rap group Onyx.

Sticky Fingaz was discovered by Jam Master Jay of Run-D.M.C., who signed Onyx on his label JMJ Records provided that Sticky would be in the group. His signature lazy eye, raspy voice, and boundless energy brought attention to the group, and he became the frontman. 
Onyx went on to release three top-selling albums before Sticky Fingaz began his solo career.

Sticky Fingaz starred in more than 80 films and television shows. In 1993, he made his acting debut in Forest Whitaker's award-winning HBO drama Strapped. His feature film credits include Spike Lee's Clockers, In Too Deep, Lockdown, Doing Hard Time and Breaking Point, but is best known for his role as "Tyrone" in Next Friday. He made his television debut in New York Undercover and Nash Bridges, but is best known for his role as Blade in the television series Blade.

Sticky Fingaz wrote, produced, directed, and starred in two feature films done entirely in the genre of "hip hopera" through his production company Major Independents: A Day in the Life and Caught On Tape. Both films were released by Lionsgate Home Entertainment. In 2019, Fingaz released a movie It's About T.I.M.E., which features the format in which it was released – "Digital Album Movie", created by the rapper.

On August 12, 2020, Sticky Fingaz was unanimously voted to be President of the newly formed Hunger Aid Foundation. In July 2021, Sticky Fingaz opened K. Jones & Company, a holding company specializing in branding K. Jones & Company .

Early life
Jones was born in Kings County Hospital Center on November 3, 1973. He grew up in the Flatbush, Brooklyn neighborhood. When he was a child, he wanted to be a DJ.

In an interview with DJ Vlad, Jones revealed that he had been a member of the "Lo-Lifes," a local Brooklyn street gang that mainly engaged in petty retail theft of Polo clothing (rather than in drug dealing or violent turf wars). This was the reason for his nickname "Sticky Fingaz" ("sticky fingers" is an idiomatic term meaning an inclination to steal).

When his mother moved the family to Bloomfield, New Jersey, she enrolled Jones in Manhattan's High School of Art and Design, hoping he would focus on his talents, in particular his gift for drawing. In 1990, at age 16, Jones moved out of his mother's house to South Jamaica, Queens to live with his cousin Fredro Starr, who worked in Queens as a barber.

Music career

Onyx
Fredro Starr, Big DS and Suave (also known as Sonny Seeza) met Jam Master Jay in a traffic jam at The Jones Beach GreekFest Festival on July 13, 1991. Jay give them about two months to get a demo, but Suave and Big DS didn't make it to the studio because they were stranded in Connecticut. So Jeff Harris, the manager of Onyx, asked Fredro to come to the studio with his cousin, Kirk Jones, who at the time was doing a solo career under the name Trop and working in the barbershop. Fredro and Sticky Fingaz made two records, "Stik 'N' Muve" and "Exercise".

In 1993, Onyx released their debut album entitled Bacdafucup. It proved to be a commercial success and eventually went multi-platinum, largely due to the well known single "Slam". Then Onyx released on JMJ Records another two albums: All We Got Iz Us and Shut 'Em Down. JMJ Records as well as Onyx was officially removed from Def Jam on "Black Thursday" – January 21, 1999 – because the label PolyGram, who in 1994 purchased 50% of Sony's Def Jam, was sold to Seagram on December 10, 1998.

Only four years earlier, Onyx were "saving Def Jam", as Sticky Fingaz put it, but now they were hoping the label would save them. Their third—and what would become their final—album on Def Jam, "Shut 'Em Down", barely went gold.

Solo career
Jones released his debut solo album in 2001 which was titled Black Trash: The Autobiography of Kirk Jones, a concept album that followed the (fictionalized) life of Kirk Jones in a story line fashion as he is released from prison and then ultimately his death.  The album was a critical success being noted as very creative with substantial content, though it didn't gain much commercial recognition despite featuring well-known artists such as Eminem, Raekwon, Redman and Canibus.

In 2003, he released his second album, Decade "...but wait it gets worse", which was less well received by critics and gained even less mainstream acknowledgement, featuring on this album were performances from Fredro Starr & Omar Epps.

In 2019, Fingaz released his third album, It's About T.I.M.E. The album was released as a "digital album movie" and is accompanied by musical film, which tells about the life of an American rapper Sticky Fingaz, starting from his birth to the entry into Onyx. The album is available only on Sticky's own website.

Acting career
Jones was a regular on the short-lived UPN series Platinum as Grady Rhames. He also played the part of Pvt. Maurice "Smoke" Williams in the FX television series Over There, which depicts life as an American soldier in Iraq. He played Tyrone in Next Friday. Jones also played a recurring role as Kern Little, a gang leader and hiphop musician/producer on the FX series The Shield. He has also appeared in the direct-to-video and Sci-Fi Channel release House of the Dead 2.

Starting in 2006, Jones was cast as the half-human/half-vampire Blade in Blade: The Series, a continuation of the Blade film series starring Wesley Snipes, with the show airing on Spike TV. The series was cancelled on September 29, 2006 through a press release from Spike. He has completed his work on a movie titled Karma, Confessions and Holi where he plays the character Rich Smooth. Jones was a major character in the remake of the movie Flight of the Phoenix. In the video game Def Jam: Fight for NY he supplied his own voice and is one of the main antagonists throughout the story.  He also has an appearance in the sequel, Def Jam: Icon, under the name Wink. Fingaz wrote, co-produced, co-directed and starred in the movie A Day in the Life.

Fingaz released a movie It's About T.I.M.E. through his production company Major Independents on February 14, 2019. Sticky Fingaz not only wrote the script for this film, but also presented himself as a director, cinematographer and producer of the film, and also he played a role in it. A feature of this film is the format in which it was released – "Digital Album Movie", created by the rapper.

Discography

Studio albums
 Black Trash: The Autobiography of Kirk Jones (2001)
 Decade: "...but wait it gets worse" (2003)
 It's About T.I.M.E. (2019)

Mixtapes
 Stickyfingaz.com (2009)
 God of the Underground (2010)

Soundtracks
 A Day in the Life (2009)
 Caught On Tape (2013)

Filmography

Film

Television

Video Games

Awards and nominations

References

External links
Official website

Sticky Fingaz at RapGenius

1973 births
African-American male actors
African-American male rappers
American male film actors
American male television actors
Living people
Male actors from New York City
Rappers from Brooklyn
Underground rappers
Hardcore hip hop artists
21st-century American rappers
21st-century American male musicians
21st-century African-American musicians
20th-century African-American people